Amieira do Tejo is a former civil parish in the municipality of Nisa, Portugal. In 2013, the parish merged into the new parish Arez e Amieira do Tejo. It has an area of 102.44 km2 and a population of 309 (2001). The 14th century Castle of Amieira do Tejo is situated in the parish.

References

Former parishes of Nisa, Portugal